Ytterbium(II) chloride (YbCl2) is an inorganic chemical compound. It was first prepared in 1929 by W. K. Klemm and W. Schuth, by reduction of ytterbium(III) chloride, YbCl3, using hydrogen.

2 YbCl3 + H2 → 2 YbCl2 + 2 HCl

Like other Yb(II) compounds and other low-valence rare earth compounds, it is a strong reducing agent. It is unstable in aqueous solution, reducing water to hydrogen gas.

References

Chlorides
Lanthanide halides
Ytterbium compounds